Hans-Jörg Bliesener (born 6 April 1966) is an East German sprint canoer who competed in the late 1980s. He won a bronze medal in the K-4 1000 m event at the 1988 Summer Olympics in Seoul.

Bliesener also won two silver medals at the ICF Canoe Sprint World Championships, earning them in the K-2 500 m (1985) and K-4 1000 m (1986).

References

Sports-reference.com profile

1966 births
Canoeists at the 1988 Summer Olympics
German male canoeists
Living people
Olympic canoeists of East Germany
Olympic bronze medalists for East Germany
Olympic medalists in canoeing
ICF Canoe Sprint World Championships medalists in kayak
Medalists at the 1988 Summer Olympics